Maurice Emile Marie Goetghebuer (1 March 1876–26 February 1962) was a Belgian entomologist. He concentrated on Diptera, especially the Chironomidae.

See also
Photo of Goetghebuer

1876 births
1962 deaths
Belgian entomologists
Dipterists